The Cape Government Railways 2-6-0ST of 1902 was a South African steam locomotive from the pre-Union era in the Cape of Good Hope.

Between 1902 and 1904, eleven 2-6-0 Mogul type saddle-tank locomotives entered shunting service at the Table Bay Harbour in Cape Town. They were taken onto the Cape Government Railways roster in 1909. All of them were still in service when the South African Railways was established in 1912.

Manufacturer
Eleven 2-6-0 saddle-tank locomotives were delivered from Hunslet Engine Company to the Table Bay Harbour Board between 1902 and 1904. They were numbered in the range from 18 to 28 and entered service as harbour shunting engines at Table Bay Harbour in Cape Town.

Service

Table Bay Harbour Board
Prior to 1908, each of the harbours of Cape Town, Port Elizabeth and East London was controlled by a Board of Directors and, as far as locomotives were concerned, each Board purchased its own engines.

Cape Government Railways
In terms of Act 38 of 1908, the Cape Government Railways (CGR) became responsible for the administration of the three major harbours in the Cape of Good Hope with effect from 1 January 1909. The eleven locomotives at Table Bay Harbour in Cape Town were therefore all taken onto the CGR roster, renumbered in the range from 1001 to 1011.

South African Railways
When the Union of South Africa was established on 31 May 1910, the three Colonial government railways (CGR, Natal Government Railways and Central South African Railways) were united under a single administration to control and administer the railways, ports and harbours of the Union. Although the South African Railways and Harbours came into existence in 1910, the actual classification and renumbering of all the rolling stock of the three constituent railways were only implemented with effect from 1 January 1912.

In 1912, the locomotives were considered obsolete by the SAR, even though they were only eight years old. As obsolete stock, they were renumbered by having the numeral "0" prefixed to their existing numbers.

First World War
In 1915, shortly after the outbreak of the First World War, the German South West Africa colony was occupied by the Union Defence Forces. Since a large part of the territory's railway infrastructure and rolling stock was destroyed or damaged by retreating German forces, an urgent need arose for locomotives for use on the Cape gauge lines in that territory. In 1917, numbers 01003 and 01010 were transferred to the Defence Department for service in South West Africa. Both locomotives were returned to South Africa after the war.

Despite being considered obsolete, six of the locomotives remained in service until 1935 before being withdrawn and scrapped. In SAR service, all of them were transferred away from Table Bay Harbour. Five went to Durban, four to Port Elizabeth and two as workshop shunting engines to Bloemfontein.

Works numbers
The works numbers, ex works dates, original numbers, renumbering, distribution and scrapping dates of the Table Bay Harbour Board's  of 1902 are listed in the table.

References

0120
2-6-0 locomotives
1C locomotives
Hunslet locomotives
Cape gauge railway locomotives
Railway locomotives introduced in 1902
1902 in South Africa
Scrapped locomotives